5474 Gingasen, provisional designation , is a Vestian asteroid and suspected binary system from the inner regions of the asteroid belt, approximately 6 kilometers in diameter.

It was discovered on 3 December 1988, by Japanese amateur astronomers Tetsuya Fujii and Kazuro Watanabe at Kitami Observatory, Japan. It is named for the "Gingasen" railroad track in Japan.

Classification and orbit 

Gingasen is a stony S-type asteroid and member of the Vesta family. It orbits the Sun in the inner main-belt at a distance of 2.2–2.5 AU once every 3 years and 8 months (1,344 days). Its orbit has an eccentricity of 0.07 and an inclination of 6° with respect to the ecliptic.

Physical characteristics

Diameter and albedo 

According to the survey carried out by NASA's Wide-field Infrared Survey Explorer with its subsequent NEOWISE mission, Gingasen measures 5.05 kilometers in diameter, and its surface has a high albedo of 0.480, while the Collaborative Asteroid Lightcurve Link assumes a standard albedo for stony asteroids of 0.20 and derives a diameter of 6.68 kilometers with an absolute magnitude of 13.28.

Rotation period 

Four rotational lightcurves of Gingasen were obtained by Petr Pravec, David Higgins and Pedro Sada in 2008, as well as from the Palomar Transient Factory in 2010. The lightcurves gave a well-defined rotation period of 3.624 to 3.628 hours with a brightness variation of 0.11–0.18 in magnitude, superseding a previous result by Laurent Bernasconi.

Suspected binary 

During the photometric observations in 2008, the astronomers came across strong evidence that Gingasen is likely an asynchronous binary asteroid with an asteroid moon orbiting it every 3.1095 hours. However, no mutual occultation/eclipse events were observed.

Naming 

This minor planet was named after a railroad track in Hokkaido. Gingasen means "Milky Way". This 150-km public railroad connects the island's eastern cities. Each station along the line is named for a constellation. The approved naming citation was published by the Minor Planet Center on 4 April 1996.

Notes

References

External links 
 Asteroids with Satellites, Robert Johnston, johnstonsarchive.net
 Asteroid Lightcurve Database (LCDB), query form (info )
 Dictionary of Minor Planet Names, Google books
 Asteroids and comets rotation curves, CdR – Observatoire de Genève, Raoul Behrend
 Discovery Circumstances: Numbered Minor Planets (5001)-(10000) – Minor Planet Center
 
 

005474
Discoveries by Tetsuya Fujii
Discoveries by Kazuro Watanabe
Named minor planets
005474
19881203